The 1958–59 Divizia B was the 19th season of the second tier of the Romanian football league system.

The format with two series has been maintained, both of them having 14 teams. At the end of the season only the winner of the first series promoted to Divizia A, because the winner of the second series was ineligible for promotion and no teams relegated to Regional Championship, because the format will be expanded again starting with the next season.

Team changes

To Divizia B
Promoted from Divizia C
 CFR Iași
 Titanii București
 Știința Craiova
 Gloria Bistrița

Relegated from Divizia A
 Energia Recolta Târgu Mureș
 Progresul Oradea

From Divizia B
Relegated to Divizia C
 Partizanul Reghin
 Progresul CPCS București
 CFR Cluj
 CSU București

Promoted to Divizia A
 Știința Cluj
 Farul Constanța

Renamed teams 
CFR Iași was renamed as Unirea Iași.

Dinamo Bârlad was renamed as Rulmentul Bârlad.

Dinamo Obor București was renamed as Pompierul București.

Energia Recolta Târgu Mureș was renamed as CS Târgu Mureș.

Metalul Reșița was renamed as CSM Reșița.

Minerul Baia Mare was renamed as CSM Baia Mare.

Progresul Oradea was renamed as CS Oradea.

Progresul Sibiu was renamed as CSA Sibiu.

Progresul Suceava was renamed as Victoria Suceava.

Rapid II București was renamed as TAROM București.

Știința Iași was renamed as CSMS Iași.

Titanii București was renamed as Metalul Titanii București.

Other teams 
Dinamo Cluj was dissolved, all the players were moved to Dinamo Bacău, club which also took its place in the first league.

Dinamo Galați took the vacant place left in the second by Dinamo Bacău.

League tables

Serie I

Serie II

See also 

 1958–59 Divizia A

References

Liga II seasons
Romania
2